Putri Indonesia 2018, the 22nd  Puteri Indonesia pageant, was held on March 9, 2018 at Jakarta Convention Center, Jakarta, Indonesia. Bunga Jelitha, Puteri Indonesia 2017 of Jakarta SCR 5, crowned her successor, Sonia Fergina Citra of Bangka Belitung, at the end of the event. She defeated 38 other candidates to win the title of Miss Universe Indonesia 2018 and represented Indonesia at Miss Universe 2018, where she placed as one of the Top 20 finalists.

This edition also witnessed the crowning moment of other titleholders who would represent Indonesia at the major international pageants. Vania Fitryanti Herlambang of Banten was crowned as Miss International Indonesia 2018 by the reigning Puteri Indonesia Lingkungan 2017 and Miss International 2017, Kevin Lilliana Junaedy. She represented Indonesia at Miss International 2018. Wilda Octaviana Situngkir of West Kalimantan was crowned as Miss Supranational Indonesia 2018 by the reigning Puteri Indonesia Pariwisata 2017, Karina Nadila Niab. She represented Indonesia at Miss Supranational 2018.

This year's pageant featured the Colorful West Java theme, as well as a series of Puteri Indonesia quarantine events being held in the city of Bogor and Bandung in West Java. Contestants from 39 provinces participated this year.

The finale was graced by Miss Universe 2017, Demi-Leigh Nel-Peters of South Africa, Miss International 2017 Kevin Lilliana of Indonesia, and Miss Supranational 2017, Jenny Kim of South Korea.

Results

Main
The Crowns of Puteri Indonesia 2018 Title Holders 
 Puteri Indonesia 2018 (Miss Universe Indonesia 2018)
 Puteri Indonesia Lingkungan 2018 (Miss International Indonesia 2018)
 Puteri Indonesia Pariwisata 2018 (Miss Supranational Indonesia 2018)
 Puteri Indonesia Perdamaian 2018 (Puteri Indonesia 2018 Runner-up)

§ Voted into the Top 11 by Social Media

Special Award

Puteri Indonesia Kepulauan
Favorite Contestant by votes on Instagram from each group Island:

Candidates 
39 delegates competed in this year competition.

Crossovers
Contestants who previously experienced in model/ambassador or beauty pageants:
: Nandiya Deva Puspa Dewi was Smart Model Look 2015, Indonesian Model Aceh 2015 and (1st Runner-up) Indonesian Model HUNT 2015.
: Firsi Alda Feligia was Volleyball athlete.
: Yessy Fouryana was (1st Runner-up) Indonesia Top Model Kota Batam. 
: Amalia Soleha Syaihu was Gadis Jambi 2013, Gadis Remaja Jambi 2012 and (Runner-up) Upik Sarolangun 2013.
: Berliana Permatasari was (1st Runner-up) Putri Sriwijaya 2016.
: Sonia Fergina Citra was Top 10 Miss Oriental Tourism 2012 in Singapore, Putri Pariwisata Bangka Belitung 2010, Dayang Belitung 2007, Photogenic Dayang Bangka Belitung 2007, Model Mall Atrium in Style 2005, (1st Runner-up) Wajah Model Remaja Bangka Belitung 2005 and (2nd Runner-up) Wajah Model Remaja Jakarta 2005.
: Wita Ayu Aflida was (1st Runner-up) Puteri Indonesia Bengkulu 2015.
: Shafira Bella Sukma was Muli Mekhanai Pringsewu, Lampung 2017 and (Runner-up) Duta Museum Lampung 2017. 
: Aura Febryannisa was Best National Costume Miss Global Beauty Queen 2016 in Korea and (2nd Runner-up) Miss Earth Indonesia 2016. 
: Asti Wulan Adaninggar was Putri Batik Nusantara 2015, (1st Runner-up) Miss Earth Indonesia 2016, (Top 3) Putri Pariwisata Indonesia Jawa Tengah 2016 and (Top 10) Puteri Indonesia Jawa Tengah 2016.
: Mellisa Fortunita was Miss Tourism Queen of the Year Indonesia 2017 and Putri Pariwiwsata Indonesia DKI 2 2017.
: Agnes Tifani was Miss Auto Show 2017.
: Vania Fitryanti Herlambang was Young Leaders for Indonesia Regional Wave 4. 
: Tria Devitasari was Puteri Pariwisata Jawa Barat 2016 and Miss Chocolate Jawa Barat 2016.
: Kidung Paramadita was (3rd Runner-up) Miss World Indonesia 2016 representing Lampung and Putra & Putri Kampus (Papika) Unnes 2012.
: Dilla Fadiela was Wajah Femina-Busana Nasional Wajah Femina 2016 and Actor at Surga yang Tak Dirindukan.
: Alsya Sekar was Guk & Yuk Sidoarjo 2012.
: Anak Agung Ayu Mirah Cynthia was Duta Endek Kota Denpasar 2016
: Baiq Kiky Kirana was Dedara Mataram 2016, Dedara Expresi 2014 and Puteri Bunga 2014.
: Melati Kirana was Duta Wisata Indonesia NTT 2017 and Putri Pariwisata Kota Kupang 2016.
: Wilda Octaviana Situngkir was (Finalist) Miss Earth Indonesia 2017 and (1st Runner-up) Putri Pariwisata Kuburaya Kalimantan Barat.
: Putri Intan Kasela was Putri Kalimantan Selatan 2017.
: Episcia Puspita Lautt  was (3rd Runner-up) Putri Citra Indonesia 2017, Gita Puja Wyata, (1st Runner-up) Putri Pariwisata Kota Palangkaraya 2011 and (Finalist) Olimpiade Penelitian Siswa Indonesia 2010.
: Cahaya Nur Hikmah was Wajah Femina Model, Putri Dirgantara 2017, Busana Terbaik dalam Parade Busana Daerah se-Indonesia TMII 2015, (1st Runner-up) Putri Pariwisata Kalimantan Timur 2014 and Kalimantan Timur Delegation at Busana Daerah di Pekan Raya Bali 2012 - 2016.
: Desti Ayu Damayanti was Model Hijaber.
: Adlina Nadhilah was None Jakarta Barat 2015.
: Diviayu Wulandari was Putri Pariwisata Sulawesi Tenggara 2017, (1st Runner-up) Putri Citra Indonesia 2015, (2nd Runner-up) Miss Coffee Indonesia 2017.
: Sinar Wulandary Falembay was Paduan Suara Jambore Pemuda Indonesia dan ASEAN 2013, Duta IM3 Sulawesi Tengah 2013, Swimming Champion 850 meter Malang 2013, Top Model Palu 2012, Best Photogenic N2C Competition Modeling 2012, Marathon Champion Palu 2011, Duta Belia Sulawesi Tengah 2011, Paskibraka Sulawesi Tengah 2011 First Champion Volleyball Palu 2005, (1st Runner-up) Fashion Show Stik 2012, (2nd Runner-up) Mathematics Contest Palu 2005, (2nd Runner-up) CERPEN Festival 2004, (Top 10) Gading Model Search Female 2017 and (Top 10) Lady Rose Top Model 2017.
: Stevany Carolin was Nona Manado 2016.
: Liberty Chelsea Anny Rumbruren was Wajah Femina Model 2017
: Yuliana Pitornella Fotanaba was Duta Muda ASEAN Papua 2017 (ASEAN Youth Ambassador of Papua).

Post pageant notes
Sonia Fergina Citra, Miss Universe Indonesia, was hailed as Top 20 semi-finalists on the Miss Universe 2018 held on December 17, 2018 at IMPACT Arena in Bangkok - Thailand.
Vania Fitryanti Herlambang, Miss International Indonesia, was hailed as Top 15 semi-finalists at Miss International 2018 during the finals held on November 9, 2018 at the Tokyo Dome City Hall in Tokyo - Japan.
Wilda Octaviana Situngkir, Miss Supranational Indonesia, was hailed as 3rd Runner-up at Miss Supranational 2018 was held on December 7, 2018 at Hala MOSiR in Krynica-Zdrój - Poland.

References

External links 

 Official Puteri Indonesia Official Website
 Official Miss Universe Official Website
 Miss International Official Website
 Official Miss Supranational Official Website

2018
Puteri Indonesia